Environmental change is a change or disturbance of the environment most often caused by human influences and natural ecological processes. Environmental changes include various factors, such as natural disasters, human interferences, or animal interaction. Environmental change encompasses not only physical changes, but also factors like an infestation of invasive species.

See also
 Climate change (general concept) 
 Environmental degradation
 Global warming  
 Human impact on the environment
 Acclimatization
 Atlas of Our Changing Environment
 Phenotypic plasticity
 Socioeconomics

References

Ecology